Most women can continue to engage in sexual activity, including sexual intercourse, throughout pregnancy. Most research suggests that during pregnancy both sexual desire and frequency of sexual relations decrease. In context of this overall decrease in desire, some studies indicate a second-trimester increase, preceding a decrease during the third trimester.

Sex during pregnancy is a low-risk behavior except when the healthcare provider advises that sexual intercourse be avoided for particular medical reasons. For a healthy pregnant woman, there is a variety of safe ways to have sex during pregnancy.

Desire and frequency
Most research suggests that, during pregnancy, sexual desire and frequency of sexual relations decrease.  In context of this overall decrease in desire, some studies indicate a second-trimester increase, preceding a decrease. However, these decreases are not universal: a significant number of women report greater sexual satisfaction throughout their pregnancies.

Safety 

Sex during pregnancy is a low-risk behaviour except when the physician advises that sexual intercourse be avoided, because it may, in some pregnancies, lead to serious pregnancy complications or health issues such as a high-risk for premature labour or a ruptured uterus. Such a decision may be based upon a history of difficulties in a previous childbirth. However, it has been observed that evidence in this area is lacking and physicians' advice is more likely to be based on supposition than scientific knowledge.

Fetus protected by amniotic fluid
During pregnancy, the fetus is protected from sexual thrusting and unwanted semen by the amniotic fluid in the womb and by the cervical mucus plug in the woman's cervix, which forms shortly after conception.

Benefits

Psychological usefulness

Some studies in the 1980s and 1990s contend that it is useful for pregnant women to continue to be sexually active, specifically noting that overall sexual satisfaction was correlated with feeling happy about being pregnant, feeling more attractive in late pregnancy than before pregnancy, and experiencing orgasm. Sexual activity has also been suggested as a way to prepare for induced labor; some believe the natural prostaglandin content of seminal liquid can favor the maturation process of the cervix making it more flexible, allowing for easier and faster dilation and effacement of the cervix. However, the efficacy of using sexual intercourse as an induction agent "remains uncertain".

Prevention of pre-eclampsia
There is tentative evidence for exposure to partner's semen as prevention for pre-eclampsia, largely due to the absorption of several immune modulating factors present in seminal fluid.

After pregnancy

Sexual intercourse after giving birth can begin when the couple are both ready. However most American couples wait six weeks. Ovulation and thus pregnancy can begin prior to a return to regular menses.

See also
 Pregnancy fetishism

References

External links
 Sex during Pregnancy

Human sexuality
Health issues in pregnancy
Midwifery